Masud Bin Momen is the foreign Secretary of Bangladesh. He is a career Bangladeshi diplomat. He served as an Ambassador and Permanent Representative of Bangladesh to the United Nations. He previously served as Bangladesh's Ambassador to Japan and as Bangladesh's Ambassador to Italy.

Education 
Masud Bin Momen is from Sayedabad village of Kasba Upzilla of BrahmanBaria district. Famous writer Hasnat Abdul Hye is his uncle. He  obtained a bachelor's degree in economics from Dhaka University in Bangladesh. He holds MSS in Economics from the University of Dhaka and a master's degree in international relations from The Fletcher School of Law and Diplomacy in the United States.

Career 
Masud Bin Momen, a career diplomat, belongs to the 1985 batch of BCS (FA) cadre.

From 1998 to 2001, he was Director in charge of the Foreign Ministry's United Nations Wing and Foreign Secretary's Office in Dhaka.

He served as Director of Poverty Alleviation at SAARC Secretariat in Kathmandu, Nepal, from 2001 to 2004. After that he was Deputy Commissioner at the Bangladesh High Commission in New Delhi, India, from 2004 to 2006.

From 2006 to 2008, he was Director-General for Bangladesh's Ministry of Foreign Affairs, responsible for matters related to South Asia, the South Asian Association for Regional Cooperation (SAARC), the Bay of Bengal Initiative for Multi-Sectoral Technical and Economic Cooperation.

He had been Bangladesh's Ambassador to Japan since August 2012.  Before that, he had served since August 2008 as his country's Ambassador to Italy and Permanent Representative to the Food and Agriculture Organization (FAO), World Food Programme (WFP) and International Fund for Agricultural Development.

Besides those assignments, he served in Bangladesh Permanent Mission in New York and Bangladesh High Commission in Islamabad in different capacities.

On November 3, 2015 the government appointed Masud Bin Momen as the next Ambassador and Permanent Representative of Bangladesh to the United Nations.

The new Permanent Representative of Bangladesh to the United Nations, Masud Bin Momen, presented his credentials to UN Secretary-General Ban Ki-moon on 24 November 2015. On July 9 2016 he presented his credentials to the President of Guatemala Jimmy Morales on Friday at the Presidential Palace in Guatemala City as ambassador of Bangladesh to Guatemala.

References 

Bangladeshi diplomats
Permanent Representatives of Bangladesh to the United Nations
Ambassadors of Bangladesh to Japan
University of Dhaka alumni
Living people
Year of birth missing (living people)